Copernicia baileyana (yarey) is a palm which is endemic to eastern and central Cuba.  Like other members of this genus, C. baileyana is a fan palm.  Trees are 10 to 20 metres tall with stems 40 (to 60) centimetres in diameter and are sometimes swollen.  The fruit is black, 1.8 to 2.3 centimetres long and 1.8 to 2 cm in diameter.

The leaves are used for weaving hats, baskets and other items.  They are also used for thatch.

References

baileyana
Trees of Cuba
Least concern plants